Aemona amathusia, the yellow dryad, is a butterfly found in Asia that belongs to the Morphinae subfamily of the brush-footed butterflies family.

Distribution
In South Asia the yellow dryad ranges from Sikkim, Bhutan, Assam, Manipur onto northern Myanmar. It also occurs in Vietnam and western China.

A related species, the white dryad (Aemona lena Atkinson), is found in South-East Asia.

Status
In 1932, William Harry Evans wrote that it was rare in its Indian range.

Cited references

Amathusiini
Butterflies of Asia
Butterflies of Indochina
Butterflies described in 1867
Taxa named by William Chapman Hewitson